Æresgjesten (The Guest of Honor) is a Norwegian film from 1919 directed by Peter Lykke-Seest. It is considered lost.

It was previously assumed that the film had not been shown publicly, but evidence has been found that it was shown in Hamar in 1919.

Plot
The consul general wants Klara James to marry a count, but he turns out to be a spy.

Cast

 Esben Lykke-Seest as Edvard
 Arthur Barking as Frank
 Helen Storm as Klara James, a widow
 Thorvald Meyer as Robert, Klara James's son
 Oscar Amundsen as the count
 Hans Ingi Hedemark
 Lila Lykke-Seest

References

External links

Æresgjesten at the National Library of Norway
Æresgjesten at Filmfront

1919 films
Norwegian silent films
Norwegian black-and-white films
Lost Norwegian films
1919 lost films
Norwegian silent short films